Jamie Samuel Lawrence Smith (born 15 February 1965) is a former field hockey player from New Zealand, who finished in eighth position with the Men's National Team, nicknamed the Black Sticks, at the 1992 Summer Olympics in Barcelona, Spain. Smith was captain of the New Zealand side from 1993 to 1998. He was born in Auckland and went to King's College.

He earned a total of 160 national caps.

References

External links
 

New Zealand male field hockey players
Field hockey players at the 1992 Summer Olympics
1998 Men's Hockey World Cup players
Olympic field hockey players of New Zealand
Field hockey players from Auckland
1965 births
Living people